Arenys, Catalan for "sands (of a seasonal creek)", may refer to:
 Arenys de Mar, municipality in the comarca of Maresme
 Arenys de Munt, municipality in the comarca of Maresme

See also 
 Arens de Lledó, municipality in the province of Teurel